Wallace House or Wallace Farm may refer to:

Places in the United States 
(by state, then city)
J. N. Wallace House, Boise, Idaho, listed on the National Register of Historic Places (NRHP) in Ada County, Idaho
 Wallace House (University of Chicago), Illinois
Henry C. Wallace House, Winterset, Iowa, listed on the NRHP in Madison County, Iowa
Henry Wallace House, Des Moines, Iowa, NRHP-listed
Charles Wallace House, Hartford, Kentucky, listed on the NRHP in Ohio County, Kentucky
Michael Wallace House, Kirksville, Kentucky, listed on the NRHP in Garrard County, Kentucky
Samuel Wallace House, Midway, Kentucky, listed on the NRHP in Woodford County, Kentucky
Wallace-Alford Farmstead, Midway, Kentucky, listed on the NRHP in Woodford County, Kentucky
Napoleon Wallace House, Pierce, Kentucky, listed on the NRHP in Green County, Kentucky
Wallace House (Walton, Kentucky), listed on the NRHP in Boone County, Kentucky
Everett Wallace House, Milbridge, Maine, listed on the NRHP in Washington County, Maine
Wallace House (Independence, Missouri), a National Historic Site
Wallace House (Lebanon, Missouri), listed on the NRHP in Laclede County, Missouri
Wallace Farm (Columbia, New Hampshire), NRHP-listed
Wallace House (Somerville, New Jersey), NRHP-listed
Jonathan Wallace House, Potsdam, New York, NRHP-listed
Timothy Wallace House, Rochester, New York, NRHP-listed
Hambley-Wallace House, Salisbury, North Carolina, listed on the NRHP in Rowan County, North Carolina
Charlton Wallace House, Cincinnati, Ohio, NRHP-listed
Wallace Farm (Northfield Center, Ohio), listed on the NRHP in Summit County, Ohio
Wallace House (fur-trade post), a fur trading station located in the French Prairie in what is now Keizer, Oregon
Wallace-McGee House, Columbia, South Carolina, NRHP-listed
Gregg-Wallace Farm Tenant House, near Mars Bluff, South Carolina, NRHP-listed
Wallace-Hall House, Mansfield, Texas, listed on the NRHP in Tarrant County, Texas
Thomas Wallace House, Petersburg, Virginia, NRHP-listed
Wallace-Jagdfeld Octagon House, Fond du Lac, Wisconsin, NRHP-listed

Persons
Wallace House (politician) (1929–1985) was an educator and politician in Newfoundland, Canada

See also
Gen. Lew Wallace Study, Crawfordsville, Indiana
John M. Wallace Fourplex, Portland, Oregon
Wallace-Baily Tavern, Brier Hill, Pennsylvania
Wallace-Cross Mill, Felton, Pennsylvania
Wallace Building (disambiguation)
Wallace (disambiguation)